is a passenger railway station in the city of Toride, Ibaraki Prefecture, Japan operated by the private railway company Kantō Railway.

Lines

Station layout
The station consists of a single island platform, connected to the station building by a level crossing. The station is unattended.

Platforms

Adjacent stations

History
Shin-Toride Station was opened on 1 April 1968.

Passenger statistics
In fiscal 2018, the station was used by an average of 2008 passengers daily (boarding passengers only).

Surrounding area
Toride-Terada Post Office

See also
 List of railway stations in Japan

References

External links

 Kantō Railway Station Information 

Railway stations in Ibaraki Prefecture
Railway stations in Japan opened in 1968
Toride, Ibaraki